Joseph William Locke (born 24 September 2003) is a Manx actor. He is known for his lead role as Charlie Spring in the Netflix teen series Heartstopper (since 2022), for which he received a nomination for the Children's and Family Emmy Award for Outstanding Lead Performance.

Early life and education
Joseph William Locke was born on 24 September 2003. He grew up in Douglas, Isle of Man. He attended Ballakermeen High School. He told ITV's This Morning in April 2022 that he was studying for A-Level exams in politics, history and English.

While in high school, Locke and three fellow students submitted a petition to government officials to investigate the feasibility of welcoming Syrian refugees to the Isle of Man.

Career
Locke participated in the 2020 National Theatre Connections as well as productions at the Gaiety Theatre and with the Kensington Art Centre's youth group.

In April 2021, it was announced Locke would star as lead character Charlie Spring in his debut television role in the 2022 Netflix coming-of-age series Heartstopper, an adaptation of the webcomic and graphic novel of the same name by Alice Oseman. He was chosen out of 10,000 other potential actors who were up for the role through an open casting call. While Locke was 17 at the time of the filming, his role has him playing a 14–15 year old student in an English boys' grammar school.

In November 2022, it was announced that Locke had been cast in Marvel Studios' WandaVision spin-off television series Agatha: Coven of Chaos for Disney+.

Personal life
Locke has spoken about his experiences of being a young gay man from the Isle of Man and their parallels with Charlie's story in the Heartstopper series. In August 2022, the Isle of Man's health minister, Lawrie Hooper, announced that the government would change its blanket ban on gay men donating blood after Locke called for the "archaic" rule to be changed in a video message played at the island's annual pride celebration.

Filmography

Television

Theatre

Accolades

References

External links

2003 births
21st-century Manx male actors
21st-century British LGBT people
British male child actors
British male television actors
British male stage actors
Living people
Manx gay actors
People from Douglas, Isle of Man
Place of birth missing (living people)